Club Baloncesto Valladolid, S.A.D. was a professional basketball team based in Valladolid, Castile-León, Spain. CB Valladolid was member of the Asociación de Clubs de Baloncesto (ACB). Famous players that have played for the team include Arvydas Sabonis, Oscar Schmidt, John Williams, Ed O'Bannon and Panagiotis Vasilopoulos.

In 2015, the club was dissolved due to financial problems. It was replaced by the CB Ciudad de Valladolid, immediately created by the former player Mike Hansen.

Sponsorship naming
CB Valladolid has received diverse trade names along its history. These are their denominations along the years:

Season by season

Home arenas

Polideportivo Huerta del Rey (1976–85)
Polideportivo Pisuerga (1985–2015)

Notable players

Head coaches
Paco García 2005–2006
Javier Imbroda 2006–2008
Porfirio Fisac 2008–2012, 2014–2015
Luis Casimiro 2011–2012
Roberto González 2012–2013
Ricard Casas 2013–2014

Honors and titles

Trophies
2nd division championships: (2)
 1ª División B: (1) 1979
LEB Oro: (1) 2009
Copa Castilla y León: (8)
2003, 2005, 2006, 2006, 2007, 2009, 2010, 2011

Individual awards
ACB Slam Dunk Champion
Gaylon Nickerson – 1999

ACB Three Point Shootout Champion
Oscar Schmidt – 1994

All LEB Oro First Team
Mikel Uriz – 2015

References

External links

Official website

 
Defunct basketball teams in Spain
Former Liga ACB teams
Former LEB Oro teams
Basketball teams established in 1976
1976 establishments in Spain
Basketball teams disestablished in 2015
Basketball teams in Castile and León
Sport in Valladolid